Fast Food Nation is a 2006 comedy-drama film directed by Richard Linklater and written by Linklater and Eric Schlosser. The film, an international co-production of the United States and the United Kingdom, is loosely based on Schlosser's bestselling 2001 non-fiction book Fast Food Nation.

Plot
Don Anderson is the Mickey's hamburger chain marketing director who helped develop the "Big One", its most popular menu item. When he learns that independent research has discovered a considerable presence of fecal matter in the meat, he travels to the fictitious town of Cody, Colorado to determine if the local Uni-Globe meatpacking processing plant, Mickey's main meat supplier, is guilty of sloppy production. Don's tour shows him only the pristine work areas and most efficient procedures, assuring him that everything the company produces is immaculate.

Suspicious of the façade he's been shown, Don meets rancher Rudy Martin, who used to supply cattle to the Uni-Globe plant. Rudy and his Chicana housekeeper both assure him that because of the plant's production level, several safety regulations are ignored or worked against; workers have no time to make sure that the manure coming from the intestines stays away from the meat. Don later meets with Harry Rydell, executive VP of Mickey's, who admits being aware of the issue, but is not concerned.

Amber is a young, upbeat employee of Mickey's, studying for college and living with her mother Cindy. While her life seems to be set, she continually faces the contrast between her current career and her own ambition, emphasized by her two lazy co-workers, Brian and Andrew, who, having heard of armed robberies at fast food restaurants in the area, start planning their own.

Amber and Cindy are visited by Cindy's brother Pete, who encourages Amber to leave town and start a real career. Amber eventually meets a group of young activists, Andrew, Alice, and Paco, who plan to liberate cattle from Uni-Globe as their first act of rebellion. They proceed to sneak up to a holding pen at the plant, but after breaking down the fence, they are shocked that the cattle make no attempt to leave. Upon hearing the police, they retreat and contemplate why the cattle decided to stay in confinement.

Raul, his love interest Sylvia, and Sylvia's sister Coco are illegal immigrants from Mexico, trying to make it in Colorado. They all go to Uni-Globe in hopes of finding a job – Raul becomes a cleaner, while Coco works on a meat processing conveyor belt. Sylvia, however, cannot take the environment, and instead finds a job as a hotel maid. Coco develops a drug habit, and begins an affair with her exploitative superior, Mike.

In a work accident, a friend of Raul's falls in a machine, and his leg is mangled. Raul, attempting to save him, falls and is injured. At the hospital, Sylvia is told that Raul was on amphetamines at work. Because Raul is now unable to work, Sylvia has sex with Mike in order to find a job at Uni-Globe. She ends up working on the "kill floor."

Cast

Production
The film was shot on location in Austin and Houston, Texas, and Colorado Springs, Colorado, as well as in Mexico. The meat packing plant was in Mexico as well.

Release
The film premiered In Competition at the 2006 Cannes Film Festival on May 19. It went into limited release in Australia on October 26, 2006.

Box office
The film opened on 321 screens in the US on November 17, 2006, and earned $410,804 in its opening weekend. It eventually grossed $1,005,539 in the US and $1,203,783 in foreign markets for a total worldwide box office of $2,209,322.

Home media
The DVD was released on March 6, 2007, and grossed $6.44 million in rentals in its first seven weeks.

Critical reception
The film received mixed reviews. Film review aggregator Rotten Tomatoes indicates that the film has an approval rating of 50%, based on 149 reviews, with an average score of 5.7/10. The site's consensus states, "Despite some fine performances and memorable scenes, Fast Food Nation is more effective as Eric Schlosser's eye-opening non-fiction book than as Richard Linklater's fictionalized, mostly punchless movie." On Metacritic, the film has a score of 64 out of 100 based on reviews from 33 critics, indicating "generally favorable reviews".

A. O. Scott of The New York Times said about the film, "while it does not shy away from making arguments and advancing a clear point of view, is far too rich and complicated to be understood as a simple, high-minded polemic. It is didactic, yes, but it's also dialectical. While the climactic images of slaughter and butchery — filmed in an actual abattoir — may seem intended to spoil your appetite, Mr. Linklater and Mr. Schlosser have really undertaken a much deeper and more comprehensive critique of contemporary American life ... The movie does not neglect the mute, helpless suffering of the cows, but it also acknowledges the status anxiety of the managerial class, the aspirations of the working poor (legal and otherwise) and the frustrations of the dreaming young. It's a mirror and a portrait, and a movie as necessary and nourishing as your next meal."

Peter Travers of Rolling Stone awarded the film three out of four stars and added, "It's less an exposé of junk-food culture than a human drama, sprinkled with sly, provoking wit, about how that culture defines how we live ... The film is brimming with grand ambitions but trips on many of them as some characters aren't given enough screen time to register and others vanish just when you want to learn more about them."

Ruthe Stein of the San Francisco Chronicle felt "for all the filmmaker's good intentions, Fast Food Nation isn't a particularly good movie. It doesn't hold together or grip you the way a documentary might have. The people are sketchily drawn – just when you start to care about one of them, he or she vanishes. To get the consumer-beware message across, much of the dialogue sounds like preaching, an unnatural way to talk in what's billed as entertainment ... But it does get its message across. You're unlikely to leave the theater with a hankering for a fast food patty of any size."

Todd McCarthy of Variety wrote, "Richard Linklater's rough-hewn tapestry of assorted lives that feed off of and into the American meat industry is both rangy and mangy; it remains appealing for its subversive motives and revelations even as one wishes its knife would have been sharper ... In the end, viewers waiting for an emotional and/or dramatic payoff will be disappointed. As a call-to-arms, it's highly sympathetic but surprisingly mild-mannered."

Awards and nominations
Richard Linklater was nominated for the Palme d'Or at the 2006 Cannes Film Festival, and the Imagen Foundation nominated Wilmer Valderrama Best Actor in Film.

The film won Best Feature Film at the 21st Genesis Awards.

See also
 List of American films of 2006
 The Corporation (film) — a 2003 Canadian documentary film critical of the modern-day corporation and its behavior towards society

References

External links
 
 
 
 

2006 films
2006 comedy-drama films
American comedy-drama films
British comedy-drama films
2000s English-language films
2000s Spanish-language films
Films directed by Richard Linklater
Criticism of fast food
Films about animal rights
Films about the food industry
Films about food and drink
Films about illegal immigration to the United States
Films based on non-fiction books
Films shot in Houston
Films shot in Austin, Texas
Films shot in Colorado
BBC Film films
Fox Searchlight Pictures films
Participant (company) films
Films produced by Jeremy Thomas
Hyperlink films
2006 comedy films
2006 drama films
2000s American films
2000s British films